Cecil Lee Upshaw Jr. (October 22, 1942 – February 7, 1995) was an American professional baseball right-handed relief pitcher, who had a nine- year career in Major League Baseball (MLB) (1966–1969, 1971–1975), for the Atlanta Braves and Houston Astros of the National League (NL), and the Cleveland Indians, New York Yankees, and Chicago White Sox of the American League (AL).

Born in Spearsville, Louisiana, Upshaw attended Bossier High School (Louisiana) and played college baseball at Centenary College of Louisiana, in Shreveport. He is a member of the Centenary Athletics Hall of Fame. While at Centenary, Upshaw was a member of the Kappa Sigma fraternity.

Upshaw was among the top ten in saves four times in the National League between 1968 and 1972. He was primarily a sidearm pitcher.

In the Braves’ division-winning  campaign, Upshaw had a 6–4 win–loss record, with a 2.91 earned run average (ERA), and a career-high 27 saves (to finish second in the league).

Upshaw‘s career was cut short due to an unfortunate incident in 1970. He and two other Braves players were walking down a San Diego sidewalk and one of the other players bet him he could not jump up and touch an overhead awning. Upshaw did reach the awning, but a ring on his pitching hand ring finger got caught on a projection off of the awning and tore ligaments in his hand. He never fully recovered, but he was considered one of the better relief pitchers in major league baseball up to that time.

Upshaw was traded four times within a span of two years, including at two consecutive Winter Meetings. First, from the Braves to the Astros for Norm Miller on April 22, 1973. Then, from the Astros to the Indians for Jerry Johnson on December 3, 1973. He was acquired along with Chris Chambliss and Dick Tidrow by the Yankees from the Indians for Fritz Peterson, Steve Kline, Fred Beene and Tom Buskey on April 26, 1974. The Yankees were criticized for giving away four pitchers as opposed to the two it got in return and a failure to land a starting second baseman. Finally, from the Yankees to the White Sox for Eddie Leon on December 5, 1974.

Upshaw finished his career with 87 saves. He had a career ERA of 3.13. Upshaw pitched 563 career innings, in 348 games.

On February 7, 1995, Upshaw died at age 52 of a heart attack in Lawrenceville, Georgia.

References

External links

Cecil Upshaw at SABR (Baseball BioProject)
Cecil Upshaw at Pura Pelota (Venezuelan Professional Baseball League)
Cecil Upshaw at The Deadball Era

Centenary Athletics
Kappa Sigma Alumni

1942 births
1995 deaths
Arizona Instructional League Athletics players
Atlanta Braves players
Austin Braves players
Baseball players from Louisiana
Centenary Gentlemen baseball players
Centenary Gentlemen basketball players
Chicago White Sox players
Cleveland Indians players
Florida Instructional League Reds players
Greenville Braves players
Houston Astros players
Major League Baseball pitchers
New York Yankees players
People from Lawrenceville, Georgia
People from Union Parish, Louisiana
Richmond Braves players
Tigres de Aragua players
Venezuelan Professional Baseball League players by team
West Palm Beach Braves players
American men's basketball players
Sportspeople from the Atlanta metropolitan area